Thomas Wilkinson  (6 April 1799 – 20 April 1881) was a politician in colonial Victoria (Australia) and a member of the Victorian Legislative Council.

Van Diemen's Land 
Wilkinson was born in Sunderland, and arrived in Van Diemen's Land in 1833.

On Flinders Island, he translated portions of Genesis for the use of the natives. Commenting on this translation, G. W. Walker says:

Port Phillip District 
Wilkinson arrived in the Port Phillip District in April 1840 via Van Diemens Land. He was the founder of the Portland Guardian newspaper.

Politics 
On 10 September 1851, Wilkinson was elected as a member of Portland in the first (unicameral) Victorian Legislative Council. 
He was sworn-in November 1851 and held the seat until the original Council was abolished in March 1856.

Wilkinson died in Brunswick, Victoria, on 20 April 1881.

References

 

1799 births
1881 deaths
Members of the Victorian Legislative Council
English emigrants to Australia
People from the City of Sunderland
Politicians from Tyne and Wear
19th-century Australian politicians